The Wrexham-Rhos transmitting station is a digital television relay of Moel-y-Parc, and forms part of the Wales television region. Despite its name, the station is situated in Moss Village and serves the city of Wrexham, the northern area of Wrexham County Borough and south-western Flintshire. It is a free-standing lattice tower structure serving around 85,000 homes which are unable to receive broadcasts from Moel-y-Parc due to Hope Mountain.

This area is traditionally served by English transmitters at Winter Hill and The Wrekin, which have historically provided English-language channels Channel 4 and Channel 5, plus the digital terrestrial services ONdigital/ITV Digital (from 1998 to 2002) and Freeview from 2002 onwards. Wrexham-Rhos was constructed to coincide with the 1977 National Eisteddfod in Wrexham, initially providing S4C and BBC One Wales, later joined by HTV Wales in 1997 and BBC Two Wales in 1999.

In 1998, the station was used to improperly transmit a hoax that temporarily blocked normal television programming on Channel 4. The hoax stated that there had been an outbreak of a deadly rash that had spread through improper contact with sheep. They urged viewers to head to their local hospitals and as a result Wrexham and other parts of North Wales witnessed a surge in ER admissions.

Services available

Analogue television

1977 - 1 November 1982

1 November 1982 - 30 March 1997

30 March 1997 - 1999

1999 - 2000

2000 - 28 October 2009
Prior to analogue switch-off, Wrexham-Rhos broadcast four of the five national terrestrial stations. Channels 1 to 3 were broadcast at 200 W ERP, while S4C was broadcast at 400 W. In 1998, due to the upcoming launch of ONdigital from neighbouring transmission site, Winter Hill, S4C from the relay was required to change frequency (from UHF Channel 67) two years later. A message was displayed telling viewers to re-tune their televisions of the channel were carried for a couple of months. When the original frequency was switched off, the power on the newer version was increased.

Analogue and digital television

28 October 2009 - 25 November 2009

Digital television

25 November 2009 - present
At present, the station broadcasts three of the six national digital terrestrial television multiplexes on the "Freeview Lite" service. The station switched over to digital transmissions from analogue throughout November 2009, and remaining analogue services ceased at midnight on 25 November 2009. BBC A and Digital 3&4 broadcast using MPEG2 compression on DVB-T standards, whilst the HD multiplex, BBC B, uses DVB-T2.

Analogue radio (FM VHF)

Digital radio (DAB)

On air date March 2013

See also
Winter Hill transmitting station
The Wrekin transmitting station

References

External links
mb21 - The Transmission Gallery - photographs
ukfree.tv Shutdown plans for Wrexham-Rhos

Buildings and structures in Wrexham County Borough
Transmitter sites in Wales